Mayak, Azerbaijan may refer to:
 Mayak, Beylagan
 Birinci Mayak, Neftchala Rayon
 İkinci Mayak, Neftchala Rayon